Zájezd Zoo is a zoo in Zájezd in the Central Bohemian Region of the Czech Republic. It is one of the smallest zoos in the country.

History
The zoo was founded in 1998 by Jiří Marek and Dana Fraňková, and opened its gates in 2010.

Gallery

References

External links

Zoos established in 1939
Buildings and structures in the Central Bohemian Region
Tourist attractions in the Central Bohemian Region
Zoos in the Czech Republic
2010 establishments in the Czech Republic
21st-century architecture in the Czech Republic